Nevidzany is a village and municipality in Zlaté Moravce District of the Nitra Region, in western-central Slovakia.

History
In historical records the village was first mentioned in 1229.

Geography
The municipality lies at an altitude of 181 metres and covers an area of 10.258 km². It has a population of about 615 people.

References

External links
http://www.e-obce.sk/obec/nevidzany-zlatemoravce/nevidzany.html

Villages and municipalities in Zlaté Moravce District